The 2021 season was the Denver Broncos' 52nd season in the National Football League and the 62nd overall. It was also the final season under the ownership of Pat Bowlen's estate.

2021 marked the first season since 2011 in which John Elway did not serve as general manager, as he relinquished those duties shortly after the end of the 2020 season. Elway remained part of the Broncos' personnel, as the president of football operations, and led the hiring of new general manager George Paton.

The Broncos started 3–0, albeit against teams who would combine for a 11–40 record (New York Giants, Jacksonville Jaguars and New York Jets), but after that, the Broncos' performance was memorably bad, going 4–10 the rest of the way, including losing their last four games. The Broncos' slightly improved on their 5–11 record from 2020, but missed the playoffs for a sixth consecutive season and suffered their fifth consecutive losing season—both the second-longest in franchise history following a loss to the Los Angeles Chargers in Week 17. Linebacker Von Miller, the Broncos' franchise record-holder for the most career sacks, was traded to the Los Angeles Rams at mid-season.

Statistically, the Broncos' ranked third in scoring defense, and their defense also ranked within the top 10 in total yards and passing yards. However, their offense ranked in the bottom 10 in points scored, scoring 30+ points only twice and failing to reach 20 points in 9 of their 17 games, resulting in the firing of head coach Vic Fangio after three seasons.

Coaching changes

 February 4: Chris Cook was hired as an offensive quality control coach.
 February 8: Christian Parker was hired as a defensive backs coach. He spent the previous two seasons with the Green Bay Packers as a defensive quality control coach. Parker replaces Renaldo Hill, who departed on January 25 to become the Los Angeles Chargers' defensive coordinator.

Front office changes
 January 3: During halftime of the Broncos' 2020 regular season finale, director of player personnel Matt Russell announced his retirement, after eight seasons in that role.
 January 4: John Elway announced that he will remain president of football operations, but will relinquish his general manager duties, and led the hiring of a new general manager.
 January 13: George Paton was hired as the new Broncos' general manager. Paton spent the previous 14 seasons in the Minnesota Vikings' front office, including the previous nine seasons as the Vikings' assistant general manager and the last three as vice president of player personnel.
 May 21: Darren Mougey was promoted to be Paton's right-hand man, director of player personnel.

Roster changes

Future contracts
All players listed below were signed to reserve/future contracts on January 4, unless noted otherwise. The signings include all ten players who were on the practice squad of the final roster at the end of the 2020 season. Each player was officially added to the active roster on March 17—the first day of the 2021 league year.

Free agents

Unrestricted

Note: Unrestricted free agents who were originally Restricted free agents (RFA) had three accrued seasons whose contracts expired at the end of the previous season, and did not receive a qualifying offer before the start of the 2021 league year on March 17.

Restricted and exclusive-rights

Signings

Departures

Draft

Draft trades

Undrafted free agents
All undrafted free agents were signed on May 2—one day after the 2021 NFL Draft concluded, unless noted otherwise.

Post-draft trades

Injuries

Von Miller trade
On November 1, linebacker Von Miller was traded to the Los Angeles Rams in exchange for the Rams' second- and third-round selections in the 2022 NFL Draft. Miller left the team as the franchise record-holder for the most career sacks in Denver Broncos' history. He was selected to the Pro Bowl eight times and received the first-team All-Pro honor three times. He also received MVP honors in Super Bowl 50, when the Broncos defeated the Carolina Panthers in 2015.

Practice squad elevations
Each NFL team is permitted to elevate up to two players from the practice squad to the active game day roster per week, with those designated players being allowed to return to the practice squad up to two times without being exposed to waivers. If a practice squad player is elevated to the game day roster for a third time, that player will be required to clear waivers before returning to the practice squad. Teams are also permitted to protect a maximum of four practice squad players to prevent opposing teams from signing those players to their active rosters.

Note: Damarea Crockett and Curtis Robinson were elevated in Week 10 as COVID-19 replacements.

COVID-19 designations
 July 26: Safety Jamar Johnson and cornerback Kary Vincent Jr., the team's fifth- and seventh-round draft selections, respectively, were placed on the Reserve/COVID-19 list. Vincent was activated on July 31, while Johnson was activated on August 6.
 October 26: Guard Netane Muti was placed on the Reserve/COVID-19 list. He was activated on November 9 with a roster exemption.
 November 2: Tight end Noah Fant was placed on the Reserve/COVID-19 list. He was activated on November 10.
 November 8: Backup quarterback Drew Lock was placed on the Reserve/COVID-19 list. He was activated on November 20.
 November 9: Cornerback Michael Ojemudia, who was on injured reserve at the time, as well as linebacker Justin Strnad, were placed on the Reserve/COVID-19 list. They were both activated on November 20.
 November 12: Guard Austin Schlottmann was placed on the Reserve/COVID-19 list. He was activated on November 24.
 Offensive coordinator Pat Shurmur missed the Broncos' Week 10 loss to the Philadelphia Eagles due to a positive COVID-19 test.
 November 22: Offensive tackle Garett Bolles was placed on the Reserve/COVID-19 list. He was activated on December 2.
 December 10: Running back Mike Boone and safety P. J. Locke were placed on the Reserve/COVID-19 list. Lock was activated on December 18, while Boone was activated on December 21.
 December 11: Linebacker Malik Reed was placed on the Reserve/COVID-19 list. He was activated on December 22.
 December 23: Center Lloyd Cushenberry was placed on the Reserve/COVID-19 list. He was activated on December 29
 December 27–30: In the week leading up to the Broncos' Week 16 game at the Los Angeles Chargers, numerous players were placed on the Reserve/COVID-19 list: defensive end McTelvin Agim, cornerbacks Bryce Callahan and Mike Ford, linebackers Baron Browning Bradley Chubb, Jonathon Cooper, Andre Mintze and Stephen Weatherly, nose tackle Mike Purcell, offensive tackles Calvin Anderson and Bobby Massie, wide receivers Jerry Jeudy and  Tim Patrick, and safety Caden Sterns. Mintze was later activated on January 1, while the rest were activated on January 5.
 January 3: Placekicker Brandon McManus and punter Sam Martin were placed on the Reserve/COVID-19 list. Both were activated four days later (January 7).

Staff

Final roster

Preseason
The Broncos' preseason schedule was announced on May 12.

Regular season

Schedule
The Broncos' 2021 schedule was announced on May 12. Until the Week 18 flex, the Broncos would not have appeared on Monday Night Football for the first time since 1991.

Note: Intra-division opponents are in bold text.

Game summaries

Week 1: at New York Giants

After a scoreless first quarter, a 23-yard field goal by placekicker Brandon McManus gave the Broncos the early lead. The drive was extended after Teddy Bridgewater, the Broncos' fifth different Week 1 starting quarterback in as many seasons, completed a 15-yard pass to wide receiver Tim Patrick on a 4th-and-7 at the Giants' 37-yard line. The Giants took a 7–3 lead on their first possession of the second quarter, with a 37-yard touchdown pass from quarterback Daniel Jones to wide receiver Sterling Shepard. It was the only time in the game that the Broncos would trail. After tight end Albert Okwuegbunam lost a fumble deep in Giants' territory, the Broncos took the lead for good with 24 unanswered points. Just before halftime, Bridgewater connected with Patrick on a 2-yard touchdown pass, three plays after another fourth down gamble near midfield. On the initial possession of the second half, Okwuegbunam atoned for his earlier fumble, with a 4-yard touchdown reception from Bridgewater on a 4th-and-1. The drive was extended after a fumble by wide receiver Jerry Jeudy at the Giants' 13-yard line was overturned by a booth review. The Giants advanced deep into Broncos' territory on their next possession; however, Broncos' linebacker Josey Jewell forced a fumble off Jones at the 15-yard line. The Broncos took advantage of the turnover, and increased their lead to 20–7 early in the fourth quarter, with a 36-yard field goal by McManus. The Giants reached the Broncos' 6-yard line with 6:30 remaining in the game, hoping for a rally, but the Broncos' defense forced a turnover on downs. Four plays later, the Broncos put the game out of reach, with a 70-yard touchdown run by running back Melvin Gordon.

Week 2: at Jacksonville Jaguars

After surrendering a 25-yard touchdown pass from Jaguars' quarterback Trevor Lawrence to wide receiver Marvin Jones on the game's opening drive, the Broncos reeled off 23 unanswered points. After getting on the scoreboard with a 32-yard field goal by placekicker Brandon McManus, quarterback Teddy Bridgewater threw a pair of touchdown passes—a 12-yarder to wide receiver Tim Patrick in the second quarter, followed in the third quarter by a 14-yarder to tight end Noah Fant. Jaguars' placekicker Josh Lambo missed on two field goal attempts in the second quarter, while McManus added two more field goals—a 46-yarder late in the third quarter, followed by a 50-yarder with 5:42 remaining in the game. After the latter field goal, Jaguars' return specialist Jamal Agnew returned the ensuing kickoff 102 yards for a touchdown that pulled the Jaguars to within a 23–13 deficit. However, the Broncos' defense denied the two-point conversion attempt that would have pulled the Jaguars to within a one-score deficit. The Broncos then proceeded to run out the clock.

Week 3: vs. New York Jets

The Broncos' defense sacked Jets' rookie quarterback Zach Wilson five times and forced two interceptions, in a dominating 26–0 win. Offensively, running backs Javonte Williams and Melvin Gordon each rushed for a 1-yard touchdown, and placekicker Brandon McManus added four field goals. It was the Broncos' second consecutive shutout of the Jets in Denver, following a 23–0 win in 2017. The Broncos started 3–0 for the first time since 2016.

Week 4: vs. Baltimore Ravens

The Broncos' offense struggled and the defense surrendered 405 yards, in a 23–7 loss to the Ravens. After a scoreless first quarter, the Broncos took a 7–0 lead early in the second quarter, with a 3-yard touchdown pass from quarterback Teddy Bridgewater to tight end Noah Fant. However, the Broncos' offense sputtered for the remainder of the game, and Bridgewater entered concussion protocol just before halftime. Backup quarterback Drew Lock took over in the second half, and was sacked five times. The Broncos went 3-for-14 on third down, failed to cross midfield until their last possession, when Lock was intercepted in the end zone with only ten seconds remaining in the game, and the Broncos trailing 23–7. Defensively, the Broncos' yielded two touchdowns in the second quarter—an 11-yard run by Ravens' running back Latavius Murray and a 49-yard pass from quarterback Lamar Jackson to wide receiver Marquise Brown. Placekicker Justin Tucker added three field goals—a 40-yarder at the end of the first half, followed by a 46- and 20-yarder in the fourth quarter.

Week 5: at Pittsburgh Steelers

A slow offensive start and three critical penalties proved costly for the Broncos, in a 27–19 loss to the Steelers. The Broncos trailed 10–3 after the defense surrendered a 50-yard touchdown pass from Steelers' quarterback Ben Roethlisberger to wide receiver Diontae Johnson on the game's opening drive, followed by a 48-yard field goal by placekicker Chris Boswell. In between, a 39-yard field goal by placekicker Brandon McManus got the Broncos on the scoreboard late in the first quarter. Midway through the second quarter, the Broncos reached the Steelers' 2-yard line after running back Javonte Williams was stopped just short of the goal line following a 49-yard run. However, Williams was flagged for a 5-yard delay of game penalty after spiking the football in anger. The Broncos lost 10 more yards after quarterback Teddy Bridgewater was sacked, forcing the Broncos to settle for a 29-yard field goal by McManus. On the Steelers' ensuing possession, Broncos' cornerback Kyle Fuller was flagged for a defensive pass interference penalty on a 3rd-and-15 from the 18-yard line. Instead of forcing a field goal attempt, the Steelers capitalized and increased their lead to 17–6 just before the two-minute warning, with a 1-yard touchdown run by running back Najee Harris.

The Broncos' offense stalled near midfield on the opening possession of the second half, and the Steelers methodically marched down to the Broncos' 33-yard line, and Boswell kicked a 51-yard field goal. However, Broncos' defensive end Dre'Mont Jones was flagged for a 15-yard leverage penalty on the field goal attempt, and instead of taking the three points, the Steelers elected for the first down. Three plays later, Roethlisberger connected with wide receiver Chase Claypool on an 18-yard touchdown to give the Steelers a 24–6 lead late in the third quarter. The Broncos' offense finally got into the end zone on their next possession, with a 2-yard touchdown pass from Bridgewater to wide receiver Kendall Hinton. After forcing a Steelers' punt, the Broncos narrowed the Steelers lead to 24–19, with wide receiver Courtland Sutton, playing on his 26th birthday, receiving a 39-yard touchdown pass from Bridgewater with 5:54 remaining in the game. However, the two-point conversion attempt was unsuccessful. The Steelers responded, with a 43-yard field goal by Boswell with 2:33 remaining in the game. Without any timeouts, the Broncos had one last possession, and faced a 4th-and-goal at the 3-yard line with 17 seconds remaining. However, Bridgewater was intercepted by Steelers' cornerback James Pierre in the end zone, ending the Broncos' rally attempt.

Week 6: vs. Las Vegas Raiders

Each team reached the end zone on their initial possessions—Raiders' quarterback Derek Carr connected on a 48-yard touchdown pass to wide receiver Henry Ruggs, while Broncos' quarterback Teddy Bridgewater connected on a 23-yard touchdown pass to wide receiver Tim Patrick. However, the Broncos' struggled on both sides of the ball, and surrendered 17 unanswered points. The defense surrendered seven completions by Carr of at least 25 yards. Following a 50-yard field goal by Raiders' placekicker Daniel Carlson, Bridgewater was intercepted by cornerback Brandon Facyson late in the first quarter; however, Carlson hit the left upright on a 43-yard field goal attempt. Two touchdowns by running back Kenyan Drake—a 31-yard pass from Carr just before halftime, followed by an 18-yard run early in the third quarter—gave the Raiders a 24–7 lead. Following a 32-yard field goal by Broncos' placekicker Brandon McManus and a subsequent Raiders' punt, Bridgewater committed a fumble, and the Raiders extended their lead to 31–10 near the end of the third quarter, with running back Josh Jacobs rushing for a 1-yard touchdown. The Broncos responded on their next possession, with a 12-yard touchdown pass from Bridgewater to wide receiver Courtland Sutton. A 30-yard field goal by Carlson increased the Raiders' lead to 34–17 at the 8-minute mark of the fourth quarter. Following an interception by Bridgewater and a Raiders' punt, the Broncos narrowed the Raiders' lead to 34–24 with only 1:17 remaining in the game, with a 4-yard touchdown pass from Bridgewater to tight end Noah Fant. The Broncos recovered the onside kick, and used their final team timeout with 59 seconds remaining. Two plays later, Bridgewater threw his third interception to end the game.

Week 7: at Cleveland Browns

The Browns took a 10–0 lead after the first quarter, courtesy of a 4-yard touchdown run by running back D'Ernest Johnson, followed by a 52-yard field goal by placekicker Chase McLaughlin, who later had a 41-yard attempt blocked by Broncos' defensive end Shelby Harris at the 2-minute warning. The Broncos' offense failed to advance past their own 34-yard line on four of their five first half possessions; quarterback Teddy Bridgewater was intercepted in the end zone by Browns' safety John Johnson on a pass from the Browns' 34-yard line in a scoreless second quarter. The Broncos finally got on the scoreboard midway through the third quarter, with Bridgewater connecting with running back Melvin Gordon on an 8-yard touchdown pass. However, the Browns responded on their next possession, with a 1-yard touchdown pass from quarterback Case Keenum to fullback Johnny Stanton near the end of the third quarter. Following an exchange of punts, the Broncos narrowed the deficit to 17–14, with Bridgewater's second touchdown pass of the game—a 10-yarder to running back Javonte Williams with 5:23 remaining in the game. However, the Broncos' defense was unable to prevent the Browns from running out the clock, surrendering 52 rushing yards to D'Ernest Johnson on the Browns' game-clinching drive.

Notes:

With the loss, the Broncos' 6-game winning streak in Cleveland was snapped. The Browns' last home win over the Broncos was a 16–13 victory in 1989.

This was also linebacker Von Miller's final game in a Broncos' uniform. Miller was inactive for the team's next game vs. the Washington Football Team on October 31, and he was traded to the Los Angeles Rams the following day (November 1).

Week 8: vs. Washington Football Team

Following a scoreless first quarter, each team exchanged field goals—a 45-yarder by Broncos' placekicker Brandon McManus and a 52-yarder by Washington placekicker Chris Blewitt; the latter also had a 45-yard attempt blocked by Broncos' defensive end Shelby Harris early in the second quarter. The Broncos took a 10–3 lead just before halftime, with quarterback Teddy Bridgewater connecting with running back Melvin Gordon on a 15-yard touchdown pass. Following an exchange of punts to begin the second half, Washington tied the game, with a 20-yard touchdown pass from quarterback Taylor Heinicke to wide receiver DeAndre Carter near the end of the third quarter. McManus missed wide right on a 53-yard attempt on the Broncos' first possession of the fourth quarter. Washington attempted to take the lead on their next possession, and reached the Broncos' 29-yard line; however, Blewitt's field goal attempt from 47 yards out was blocked again—this one by defensive end Dre'mont Jones at the 9-minute mark of the fourth quarter. Eight plays later, Gordon's second touchdown of the game—a 7-yard run—gave the Broncos a 17–10 lead with 4:31 remaining in the game.

Washington marched down to the Broncos' 11-yard line with 2:37 remaining, hoping for a rally. Following two short completions and the two-minute warning, Heinicke was sacked by linebacker Malik Reed for a 13-yard loss at the 20-yard line. On 4th-and-19, Heinicke was intercepted in the end zone by safety Justin Simmons, ending the threat. With only 37 seconds remaining in the game, the Broncos' attempted to run out the clock. However, after a 1-yard run by running back Javonte Williams, a Washington timeout and an incomplete pass by Bridgewater, Gordon lost a fumble, and Washington recovered at the Broncos' 24-yard line, with only 21 seconds remaining in the game. However, the Broncos' defense subdued Washington's last rally attempt, sacking Heinicke on second down, forcing three incomplete passes and the exhaustion of Washington's two remaining timeouts.

Week 9: at Dallas Cowboys

The Broncos dominated the Cowboys on both sides of the ball and controlled the time of possession by a 2–1 margin, in a dominating and surprising 30–16 road win. Quarterback Teddy Bridgewater threw a 44-yard touchdown pass to wide receiver Tim Patrick and rushed for a 1-yard sneak, and running back Melvin Gordon rushed for a 3-yard touchdown. Placekicker Brandon McManus added three field goals—from 27, 42 and 53 yards out. In the first game of the post-Von Miller era, the Broncos' defense limited the Cowboys' No. 1 ranked offense to 290 total yards and denied the Cowboys on four 4th-down attempts. The Broncos led 30–0 with four minutes remaining in the game, and the defense surrendered two touchdown pass from Cowboys' quarterback Dak Prescott to wide receiver Malik Turner (with two successful two-point conversions), but well after the outcome had already been decided in the Broncos' favor. With the win, the Broncos extended their winning streak against the Cowboys to seven games, dating back to 1998.

Week 10: vs. Philadelphia Eagles

The Broncos fell behind 10–0 in the first quarter, with a 30-yard field goal by Eagles' placekicker Jake Elliott, followed by a 36-yard touchdown pass from quarterback Jalen Hurts to wide receiver DeVonta Smith. The Broncos got on the scoreboard in the second quarter, with a 1-yard touchdown run by running back Melvin Gordon. However, after forcing an Eagles' punt, the Broncos reached the red zone, but were forced to settle on a 21-yard field goal by placekicker Brandon McManus. Another touchdown pass from Hurts to Smith—from five yards out—coupled with a 52-yard field goal by Elliott just before halftime, gave the Eagles a 20–10 lead. The Broncos took the opening possession of the second half, and reached the Eagles' 4-yard line. However, the Broncos squandered another red zone opportunity, as McManus' 21-yard field goal attempt was blocked by Eagles' safety K'Von Wallace. After forcing the Eagles to go three-and-out, the Broncos reached the red zone yet again; however, running back Javonte Williams had a 20-yard touchdown run nullified by a holding penalty on tight end Eric Saubert. The Broncos were once again forced to settle for another short field goal by McManus—from 28 yards out. After an interception of Hurts by safety Justin Simmons, the Broncos were attempting to tie the game, and reached the Eagles' 23-yard line; however, Gordon lost a fumble, and Eagles' safety Darius Slay recovered the football and ran for an 83-yard touchdown at the end of the third quarter to give the Eagles a 27–13 lead. Elliott later added a 23-yard field goal midway through the fourth quarter to put the game out of reach. The Broncos' offense went 1-for-11 on third down, scored only one touchdown out of five red zone opportunities, and defensively, surrendered 214 rushing yards to Eagles' running backs.

Week 12: vs. Los Angeles Chargers

A pair of rushing touchdowns—an 11-yarder by quarterback Teddy Bridgewater in the first quarter, followed in the second quarter by a 9-yarder by running back Javonte Williams—gave the Broncos a 14–0 lead over the Chargers. After Bridgewater briefly exited with a lower leg injury late in the first quarter, backup quarterback Drew Lock took over, and completed four passes in seven attempts for only 26 yards, before throwing an interception near midfield with 1:22 remaining in the first half. The Chargers capitalized and got on the scoreboard just before halftime, with a 12-yard touchdown pass from quarterback Justin Herbert to running back Austin Ekeler. The Chargers took the opening possession of the second half, and reached the Broncos' 34-yard line; however, placekicker Dustin Hopkins missed wide left on a 52-yard field goal attempt. After a Broncos' punt, the Chargers once again drove deep into Broncos' territory at the end of a scoreless third quarter, and the Broncos holding on to a 14–7 lead. On the second play of the fourth quarter, with the Chargers facing a 3rd-and-14 from the 23-yard line, Broncos' cornerback Patrick Surtain II made the first of two key interceptions—picking off a pass from Herbert intended for tight end Jared Cook in the end zone for a touchback. The Broncos added to their lead, with Bridgewater's return to the game, and a 10-play, 80-yard drive that culminated in a 1-yard touchdown pass to tight end Eric Saubert. On the Chargers' ensuing possession, Surtain intercepted a pass from Herbert that went through the hands of Ekeler, and scampered down the left sideline for a 70-yard touchdown that put the game out of reach midway through the fourth quarter. The Chargers managed only one more scoring play—a 16-yard touchdown pass from Herbert to Cook (with an unsuccessful two-point conversion attempt) on the ensuing possession, but got no closer.

Week 13: at Kansas City Chiefs

The Broncos' defense limited the Chiefs to 267 total yards of offense and quarterback Patrick Mahomes to 184 yards passing, but their defensive effort was wasted by missed opportunities by their offense and nullified by three costly second half turnovers. The Broncos gained only two net yards in their first two offensive possessions and fell behind 10–0 after a 10-yard touchdown run by Mahomes and a 56-yard field goal by Chiefs' placekicker Harrison Butker. The Broncos got on the scoreboard early in the second quarter, with a 42-yard field goal by placekicker Brandon McManus. After forcing a Chiefs' punt, the Broncos went on a 10-play, 16-yard drive that devoured 10 minutes, but instead of kicking a field goal, the Broncos came up empty at the Chiefs' 8-yard line, after running back Javonte Williams was stopped for a 1-yard loss on 4th-and-2. On the opening possession of the second half, the Broncos were unable to capitalize on an interception of Mahomes by cornerback Patrick Surtain II, and were forced to punt after a three-and-out. A 45-yard field goal by Butker increased the Chiefs' lead to 13–3 at the 5:39 mark of the third quarter. The Broncos blew yet another opportunity, when quarterback Teddy Bridgewater was intercepted by safety Juan Thornhill at the Chiefs' 45-yard line. Eight plays later, Butker's third field goal of the game—from 26 yards out—increased the Chiefs' lead to 16–3 early in the third quarter. The Broncos reached the Chiefs' 27-yard line on their next possession; however, Bridgewater's pass was deflected and intercepted by Chiefs' safety Daniel Sorensen for a 75-yard touchdown (with a missed extra-point attempt). The Broncos' finally reached the end zone, with a 13-yard touchdown pass from Bridgewater to Williams; however the two-point conversion attempt was unsuccessful, keeping the score at 22–9 with 5:19 remaining in the game. The Broncos forced a Chiefs' punt, and in the process, burned two of their team timeouts, hoping for a rally with 2:43 remaining in the game. However, they turned the football over on downs near midfield.

Week 14: vs. Detroit Lions

Running backs Melvin Gordon and Javonte Williams accounted for four of the Broncos' five touchdowns—two rushing by Gordon and one rushing and one receiving by Williams—in a 38–10 rout of the Lions. The Broncos dedicated the win to wide receiver Demaryius Thomas, who died of a medical issue in his Georgia home during the previous week at the age of 33. Thomas, who played wide receiver for the Broncos from 2010 to 2018, ranks third in franchise history in receptions (behind Shannon Sharpe and Rod Smith), second in receiving yards, touchdowns and single-season receptions (all behind Rod Smith), tied with Anthony Miller for the most touchdowns in a single season, and holds the franchise records for 100-yard receiving games and receiving yardage for both a single-game and a single-season. The Broncos also wore a No. 88 decal on their helmets and had a memorial at the Ring of Fame Plaza in honor of Thomas.

Week 15: vs. Cincinnati Bengals

Through the midway point of the third quarter, all of the scoring came by way of the placekickers—53-, 54- and 28-yard field goals by the Bengals' Evan McPherson, and a 54-yard field goal by the Broncos' Brandon McManus. With only 14 seconds before halftime, McManus missed wide-right on a 51-yard attempt, giving the Bengals good field field position. A 40-yard pass completion from Bengals' quarterback Joe Burrow to wide receiver Tyler Boyd set up the 58-yard field goal by McPherson. On the Broncos' second possession of the third quarter, quarterback Teddy Bridgewater suffered a head injury while diving for a first down, and was taken to a Denver-area hospital. Backup quarterback Drew Lock took over for the remainder of the game. Lock connected with wide receiver Tim Patrick on a 25-yard touchdown pass that gave the Broncos a 10–9 lead late in third quarter. However, the Bengals responded two plays later on their next drive, with a 56-yarder touchdown pass from Burrow to Boyd. The Bengals' two-point conversion attempt was unsuccessful, leaving the score at 15–10. The Broncos reached the Bengals' 9-yard line on their next drive; however, Lock was strip-sacked by Bengals' defensive end Khalid Kareem, who advance the football to the Broncos' 42-yard line, before Broncos' offensive tackle Garett Bolles forced a fumble and recovered the football. The Broncos thought they had a new set of downs; however, a booth review revealed that Kareem was ruled down by contact at the 15-yard line after being tackled by Lock. Following an exchange of punts and the exhaustion of all of their team timeouts, the Broncos had one last possession deep in their own territory with only 1:04 remaining in the game, but lost 14 net yards, ending the game.

Week 16: at Las Vegas Raiders

After a scoreless first quarter, the Raiders took the lead early in the second quarter, with a 10-yard touchdown pass from quarterback Derek Carr to wide receiver Hunter Renfrow. The Broncos then scored 13 unanswered points leading up to halftime. First, placekicker Brandon McManus got the Broncos on the scoreboard with a 49-yard field goal. Then, after forcing a fumble off Raiders' running back Josh Jacobs, McManus followed up his first field goal with a 55-yarder. With only 26 seconds before halftime, Broncos' linebacker Bradley Chubb perfectly read a screen pass attempt by Carr and nearly returned an interception for a touchdown, as he was stopped at the Raiders' 1-yard line. On the first play from scrimmage, a 1-yard touchdown run by running back Javonte Williams gave the Broncos a 13–7 lead at halftime. However, the Broncos were held scoreless in the second half, and the Raiders reclaimed the lead on the initial possession of the second half, with a 5-yard touchdown run by Jacobs. The Broncos' defense forced a fumble off of Carr on the Raiders' next possession; however, McManus missed wife left on a 55-yard field goal attempt with 19 seconds remaining in the third quarter. The Raiders added to their lead midway through the fourth quarter, with a 41-yard field goal by placekicker Daniel Carlson. On the Broncos' ensuing possession, tight end Albert Okwuegbunam dropped a critical pass from quarterback Drew Lock in Raiders' territory, on a 2nd-and-10. On the next play, Lock, who was playing in place of regular starter Teddy Bridgewater due to concussion protocols, was sacked for a 6-yard loss. With four minutes left in the game, the Broncos decided to punt; however, their offense never got the football back. After using all of their team timeouts, their defense was unable to stop the Raiders on a critical 3rd-and-2, in which Carr completed a 28-yard pass to tight end Foster Moreau for a game-clinching first down just before the two-minute warning. The Broncos' defense surrendered 160 rushing yards, and their 12 yards of rushing offense was tied for their third-fewest in franchise history.

Week 17: at Los Angeles Chargers

The Broncos' offensive struggles continued and they never recovered from a 17–0 deficit, in a 34–13 loss to the Chargers. The Broncos trailed 20–3 at the beginning of the fourth quarter, with hopes that a 1–yard touchdown run by running back Melvin Gordon would narrow the deficit. However, it was nullified by an illegal formation penalty, and the Broncos were forced to settle on a short 26-yard field goal by placekicker Brandon McManus, who kicked a 61-yarder just before halftime. Chargers' return specialist Andre Roberts returned the ensuing kickoff 101 yards for a touchdown, and the game was put out of reach, with Chargers' quarterback Justin Herbert's second touchdown pass of the game—a 45-yarder to wide receiver Mike Williams. The Broncos' only touchdown of the game occurred at the 6:35 mark of the fourth quarter, in which quarterback Drew Lock connected on a 5-yard pass to tight end Noah Fant, by which time the game had already been decided in the Chargers' favor. With the loss, the Broncos were officially eliminated from postseason contention. The Chargers win also mathematically eliminated the Miami Dolphins, who lost to the Tennessee Titans earlier that day, and the Cleveland Browns, who were scheduled to kick off Sunday Night Football later that evening on the road against the Pittsburgh Steelers.

Week 18: vs. Kansas City Chiefs

The Broncos hosted the Chiefs in the 2021 regular season finale. The Chiefs took the early lead, with quarterback Patrick Mahomes connecting with tight end Travis Kelce on a 3-yard touchdown pass. The Broncos responded with two rushing touchdowns by quarterback Drew Lock—a 5-yard run late in the first quarter, followed by a 23-yard run midway through the second quarter. A 34-yard field goal by Chiefs' placekicker Harrison Butker narrowed the Broncos' lead to 14–10 just before the two-minute warning. The Chiefs took the lead on the initial possession of the second half, with Mahomes' second touchdown pass of the game—a 14-yarder to running back Jerick McKinnon. The Broncos responded, with a 47-yard touchdown run by running back Melvin Gordon. Butker's second field goal of the game—a 51-yarder at the beginning of the fourth quarter, narrowed the Broncos' lead to 21–20. The Broncos were attempting to add to their lead, and marched deep into Chiefs' territory, when Chiefs' linebacker Melvin Ingram penetrated into the Broncos' backfield untouched, and forced a fumble off of Gordon. Linebacker Nick Bolton scooped up the football, and returned the fumble 86 yards for a game-changing touchdown (coupled with Mahomes rushing for a successful two-point conversion). This gave the Chiefs a 28–21 lead midway through the fourth quarter. The Broncos reached the Chiefs' 13-yard line in eight plays on their next possession, and faced a 4th-and-9. However, instead of a potential game-tying touchdown, the Broncos settled for a 31-yard field goal by placekicker Brandon McManus with 4:41 remaining in the game. The Broncos' defense was unable to prevent the Chiefs from running out the clock, sealing their 13th consecutive loss to the Chiefs, dating back to 2015.

Standings

Division

Conference

Statistics

Team leaders

League rankings

Awards and honors

Pro Bowl and All-Pro selections
On January 14, 2022, safety Justin Simmons was voted to the 2021 All-Pro Team, and named to the Second Team. In addition, offensive tackle Garett Bolles and cornerback Patrick Surtain II were both named first alternates for the Pro Bowl.

References

External links
 
 Denver Broncos news, analysis, roster, stats – The Denver Post
 2021 Season page on Pro Football Reference
 NFL Nation Blog – ESPN

Denver
Denver Broncos seasons
Denver Broncos